Nashism and Nashists are post-Soviet Russian political neologisms derived from the word "наши" ("ours").

Nashism or Nashist may also refer to:

 A branch of the Situationist International movement, named after Jørgen Nash
Political platform and membership  of the following political movements:
Nashi (1990s nationalist group), a 1991 movement by Alexander Nevzorov
Nashi (youth movement), Russia, 2005
Our Ukraine (political party)
A political neologism in reference to various forms of nationalism, chauvinism or racism in modern Russia, often in association with the two Nashi movements